Samjosef Rasmo Belangel (born June 27, 1999) is a Filipino professional basketball player for Daegu KOGAS Pegasus of the Korean Basketball League (KBL).

Early life and education
SJ Belangel was born in Bacolod on June 27, 1999 to Sammy Belangel and Mayette Belangel. His father is a former college basketball player star.

Belangel studied in the Ateneo education system, first moving to the Ateneo High School in ninth grade. He graduated from the Ateneo de Manila University with a degree in interdisciplinary studies in 2022.

High school and college career
Hailing from Bacolod, SJ Belangel has suited up for the teams of Eliakim Learning School, USLS-Integrated School, St. Joseph's Academy–Iloilo, and Bacolod Tay Tung High School prior to joining Ateneo High School.

He also took part and won the Batang Pinoy 3x3 national competition held in Bacolod in 2014.

He moved to Ateneo High School and played for the Blue Eaglets after he scouted by its coach Joe Silva. He turned down offers to attend La Salle Green Hills and De La Salle Zobel despite his family having a largely La Sallian background. He ended his stint with the Eaglets in 2018 by helping them clinch the UAAP Season 80 junior title and earned a place in the Mythical Five for himself.

Belangel would commit to Ateneo, and entered Ateneo de Manila University for his college studies. He made his UAAP senior debut for the Tab Baldwin-mentored Ateneo Blue Eagles in Season 81. He played for three UAAP season featuring in 48 games played, Belangel averaged 7.38 points and 2.08 assists per contest.

Professional career

Daegu KOGAS Pegasus (2022–present)
In June 2022, Belangel decided to forego his two years of eligibility left to play for Ateneo. He decided to turn professional and play for the Daegu KOGAS Pegasus of the Korean Basketball League.

National team career

Junior national team
Belangel has played for the Philippine national team. He played for the national under-16 team in the 2015 FIBA Asia Under-16 Championship as its captain.

Senior national team
For the senior team, he took part in the 2020 FIBA Men's Olympic Qualifying Tournament in Belgrade and the 2022 FIBA Asia Cup qualifiers. In the 2022 FIBA Asia Cup, he was on the team failed to qualify for the quarterfinals.

Personal life
Belangel has a girlfriend, Isabel Cruz.

References

1999 births
Living people
Ateneo Blue Eagles men's basketball players
Basketball players from Negros Occidental
Daegu KOGAS Pegasus players
Filipino expatriate basketball people in South Korea
Filipino men's basketball players
Hiligaynon people
Philippines men's national basketball team players
Point guards
Sportspeople from Bacolod